The Macedonian Women's Volleyball League is an annual competition for women's volleyball clubs in North Macedonia. It has been held since the 1992/93 season.

History 
14 teams has participated in the 2020/21 championship in the 1st league: Vardar (Skopje), Kisela Voda [1] (Skopje), Strumica, Rabotnichki (Skopje), Nakovski Volley (Strumica), "Universitet" (Tetovo), "Fit-Fan" (Skopje), "Pelister" (Bitola), "Yanta-Forza" (Skopje), "Macedonia-Max" (Strumica), "UGD-Student" (Shtip), "Uskana" (Kichevo), "Victory Will" (Strumitsa), "Bami Kor" (Tetovo). The title was won by "Kisela Voda", which won the final series beating "Vardar" 3-1 (3: 0, 3: 1, 2: 3, 3: 2). 3rd place was taken by "Strumitsa".

List of Champions

References

External links 
 Сайт Волейбольной федерации Северной Македонии 
  Macedonian League. women.volleybox.net 

North Macedonia
Volleyball in North Macedonia
Macedonian Women's League
Sports leagues established in 1993
Sports leagues in North Macedonia